Alexander Nikolayevich Lazarev (born 5 July 1945, Moscow, Soviet Union) is a Russian conductor. He studied at the Saint Petersburg Conservatory, and later at the Moscow Conservatory with Leo Ginsbourg. In 1971, he was the first prize winner in a national conducting competition in the USSR.  In 1972, he won a first prize and gold medal in the Karajan conducting competition in Berlin.

From 1987-1995, Lazarev was both chief conductor and artistic director of the Bolshoi Theatre, the first person in over thirty years to hold both positions simultaneously.  From 1992-1995, he was principal guest conductor of the BBC Symphony Orchestra.  In 1994, Lazarev became principal guest conductor of the Royal Scottish National Orchestra (RSNO).  From 1997-2005, served as principal conductor of the RSNO, and is now its conductor emeritus.
Lazarev was the chief conductor of Japan Philharmonic Orchestra from 2009 September.

External links
Biography

1945 births
Living people
Moscow Conservatory alumni
21st-century Russian conductors (music)
Russian male conductors (music)
21st-century Russian male musicians